The Seattle Film Critics Society Award for Best Ensemble Cast is one of the annual awards given by the Seattle Film Critics Society.

Winners and nominees

2010s

2020s

References

Ensemble Cast